"Going Up the Country" (also Goin' Up the Country) is a song adapted and recorded by American blues rock band Canned Heat. Called a "rural hippie anthem", it became one of the band's biggest hits and best-known songs. As with their previous single, "On the Road Again", the song was adapted from a 1920s blues song and sung by Alan Wilson.

Background and composition
Canned Heat, who were early blues enthusiasts, based "Going Up the Country" on "Bull Doze Blues", recorded in 1928 by Texas bluesman Henry Thomas.  Thomas was from the songster tradition and had a unique sound, sometimes accompanying himself on quills, an early Afro-American wind instrument similar to panpipes.  He recorded "Bull Doze Blues" in Chicago on June 13, 1928, for Vocalion Records.

For "Going Up the Country", Canned Heat's Wilson used Thomas' melody on the quills and his basic rhythm, but arranged it for a rock setting and rewrote the lyrics.  In addition to the bass and drum rhythm section, Henry Vestine supplied a "light electric rhythm guitar" and multi-instrumentalist Jim Horn reproduced Thomas' quill parts on the flute.

Although linked to the counterculture of the 1960s' back-to-the-land movement, Wilson's lyrics are ambiguous, leading some to suggest they were about evading the draft during the Vietnam War by moving to Canada:

Releases and charts
In October 1968, Liberty Records first released "Going Up the Country" on Canned Heat's third album, Living the Blues, and followed it with a single on November 22, 1968.  The single peaked at number 11 on the Billboard Hot 100 singles chart on January 25, 1969, making it the band's best showing on the main U.S. chart.  On January 7, 1969, the song peaked at number 19 on the UK Singles Chart.

The song appears on several Canned Heat compilation albums, including Canned Heat Cookbook, Let's Work Together: The Best of Canned Heat (1989) and Uncanned! The Best of Canned Heat (1994). The group performed "Going Up the Country" at the Woodstock music festival in August 1969 and the song is used in the Woodstock film and appears on the original soundtrack album.

References

Songs about hippies
1968 songs
1968 singles
Canned Heat songs
Liberty Records singles
Hippie movement